Rakity is a rural locality (a selo) and the administrative center of Rakitovsky Selsoviet of Mikhaylovsky District, Altai Krai, Russia. The population was 2,185 in 2016. There are 15 streets.

Geography 
Rakity is located 13 km east of Mikhaylovskoye (the district's administrative centre) by road. Mikhaylovskoye is the nearest rural locality.

References 

Rural localities in Mikhaylovsky District, Altai Krai